Chester is a town in Middlesex County, Connecticut, United States. The population was 3,749 at the 2020 census. The town center is defined by the U.S. Census Bureau as a census-designated place (CDP). The name is a transfer from Chester, in England.

History
The Wangunks, a river tribe of Native Americans, occupied the land called Pattaconk prior to English settlement of the area in 1692. The town was formed from the northern quarter of Saybrook and incorporated in 1836.

In 1769, Jonathan Warner was granted permission to operate a ferry across the Connecticut River that became the Chester-Hadlyme Ferry, the second-oldest continuously operating ferry service in Connecticut. Its location is currently a state historical landmark.

Geography

Demographics

At the 2000 census there were 3,743 people, 1,510 households, and 1,005 families living in the town. The racial makeup of the town was 96.79% White, 0.85% African American, 0.35% Native American, 0.83% Asian, 0.05% Pacific Islander, 0.24% from other races, and 0.88% from two or more races. Hispanic or Latino people of any race were 1.71%.

Of the 1,510 households, 29.7% had children under the age of 18 living with them, 56.9% were married couples living together, 7.0% had a female householder with no husband present, and 33.4% were non-families. 28.1% of households were one person, and 13.0% were one person aged 65 or older.  The average household size was 2.38 and the average family size was 2.93.

The age distribution was 22.3% under the age of 18, 4.4% from 18 to 24, 30.1% from 25 to 44, 26.1% from 45 to 64, and 17.2% 65 or older.  The median age was 42 years. For every 100 females, there were 91.6 males.  For every 100 females age 18 and over, there were 91.6 males.

The median household income was $65,156 and the median family income was $79,941. Males had a median income of $45,515 versus  $40,444 for females. The per capita income for the town was $32,191.  None of the families and 1.3% of the population were living below the poverty line, including no under eighteens and 2.6% of those over 64.

CDP

At the 2000 census, there were 1,546 people, 632 households, and 401 families living in the Chester Center CDP. The population density was 762.1 inhabitants per square mile (294.0/km2). The racial makeup of the CDP was 96.31% White, 1.29% African American, 0.06% Native American, 1.36% Asian, 0.06% from other races, and 0.91% from two or more races. Hispanic or Latino of any race were 1.29% of the population.

Of the 632 households, 30.4% had children under the age of 18 living with them, 53.8% were married couples living together, 6.6% had a female householder with no husband present, and 36.4% were non-families. 30.5% of households were one person, and 10.1% were one person aged 65 or older. The average household size was 2.32 and the average family size was 2.91.

The age distribution was 21.9% under the age of 18, 4.9% from 18 to 24, 31.8% from 25 to 44, 26.1% from 45 to 64, and 15.4% 65 or older. The median age was 41 years. For every 100 females, there were 93.0 males. For every 100 females age 18 and over, there were 94.8 males.

The median household income was $64,236 and the median family income was $71,250. Males had a median income of $38,900 versus $46,354 for females. The per capita income for the CDP was $32,087. None of the families and 0.5% of the population were living below the poverty line, including no under eighteens and none of those over 64.

Education

Chester, like the other two towns in the "tri-town area" (Essex and Deep River), is a member of Regional School District #4. John Winthrop Junior High School is on Warsaw Street in Deep River, and Valley Regional High School, is on Kelsey Hill in Deep River. They serve students in grades 7–8 and 9–12, respectively. Each town in the area also has their own elementary school, serving grades K–6.

Media
The 1959 film It Happened to Jane, starring Doris Day and Jack Lemmon, was filmed in Chester. Portions of the 1971 horror film Let's Scare Jessica to Death were filmed in Chester, including the Chester–Hadlyme Ferry.

Points of interest
 The Beth Shalom Rodfe Zedek synagogue is noted for the architecture of its "spectacular" building.
 Goodspeed-at-Chester, Goodspeed Musicals' second theatre
 The Chester Museum at the Mill, a museum of the Chester Historical Society
 The Chester–Hadlyme Ferry is the second oldest continuously operating ferry service in the state of Connecticut and is a designated state historical landmark.
 Camp Hazen YMCA

On the National Register of Historic Places

 Charles Daniels House – 43 Liberty St. (added March 19, 1988)
 Dr. Ambrose Pratt House – Pratt St. (added December 9, 1972)
 Jonathan Warner House – 47 Kings Hwy. (added 1978)
 Old Town Hall – on the green between Liberty St. and Goose Hill Rd. (added March 23, 1972)
 Villa Bella Vista – 7 Old Depot Rd. (added 2000)

Industry 
The Whelen Engineering Corporation, a major designer and distributor of public service warning equipment (warning lights, sirens, etc.) in North America, is headquartered in Chester.

Transportation

Air
The Chester Airport is a local facility with one paved runway. It is privately owned by Whelen Aviation.

Ground
The Estuary Transit District provides public transportation throughout Chester and the surrounding towns through its 9 Town Transit Service.  Services include connections to the Old Saybrook Train Station, served by Amtrak and Shoreline East railroads.

Notable people

 Constance Baker Motley (1921–2005), civil rights leader
 Art Carney (1918–2003), actor; resident, died in town
 Paul Hopkins (1904–2004), major league relief pitcher; born in town
 Sol LeWitt (1928–2007), artist
 Michael P. Price (born 1938), theatre producer and artistic director
 Richard Sachs (born 1953), bicycle framebuilder and cyclist; lives in town
 Morley Safer (1931–2016), CBS news correspondent and anchor on 60 Minutes
 Max Showalter (1917–2000), film and television actor; retired to Chester
 Washington F. Willcox (1834–1909), US Congressman; resident

Pictures of Chester

References

External links

 Town of Chester official website
 Visit-Chester.com
 Town of Chester GIS maps and property information

 
Towns in Middlesex County, Connecticut
Connecticut populated places on the Connecticut River
Towns in Connecticut
Greater Hartford
1836 establishments in Connecticut